Clementine literature (also called Clementina, Pseudo-Clementine Writings, Kerygmata Petrou, Clementine Romance) is the name given to the religious romance which purports to contain a record made by one Clement (whom the narrative identifies as both Pope Clement I, and Domitian's cousin Titus Flavius Clemens) of discourses involving the Apostle Peter, together with an account of the circumstances under which Clement came to be Peter's travelling companion, and of other details of Clement's family history. The author is sometimes called Pseudo-Clement (as distinct from Pope Clement I).

Overview
Two versions of this romance have survived: one version is called the Clementine Homilies  (H), which consists of 20 books and exists in the original Greek; the other is called the Clementine Recognitions (R), for which the original Greek has been lost, but exists in a Latin translation made by Tyrannius Rufinus (died 410). Two later epitomes of the Homilies also exist, and there is a partial Syriac translation, which embraces the Recognitions (books 1–3), and the Homilies (books 10–14), preserved in two British Library manuscripts, one of which was written in the year 411. Some fragments of the Clementines are known in Arabic, Armenian and in Slavonic.

Large portions of H and R are almost word for word the same, and larger portions also correspond in subject and more or less in treatment. However, other parts contained only in one appear to be referred to or presupposed in the other. The two works are roughly of the same length, and contain the same framework of romance. H was considered to be the original by Neander, Baur, Schwegler, and others. Lehmann thought the first three books of R to be original, and H for the remainder. Gerhard Uhlhorn argued that both were recensions of an earlier book, Kerygmata Petrou (Preachings of Peter), R having best preserved the narrative, H the dogmatic teaching. Whiston, Rosenmüller, Ritschl, Hilgenfeld, and others held R to be the original.

It is now almost universally held (after F. J. A. Hort, Harnack, Hans Waitz) that H and R are two versions of an original Clementine romance, which was longer than either, and embraced most of the contents of both. Sometimes H, sometimes R, is the more faithful to the archetype.

Narrative 

Within the elaborate philosophical and dogmatic discourse which forms the bulk of both works is 
interwoven a story which, when we consider its date, may be described as positively exciting and romantic. It differs slightly in the two books. The narrative is addressed to James the Just, the Bishop of Jerusalem, and is related in the voice of Clement himself. He begins by detailing his religious questionings, his doubts about immortality, his love for celibacy, and so on. Clement hears at Rome the preaching of a man of Judea who relates the miracles of Christ. Clement defends this speaker from the mob, and follows him to Palestine. R identifies this man as Barnabas; in H, Clement likewise sets out for Palestine, but is driven by storms to Alexandria, where he is directed to Barnabas, and there defends him from the mob and follows to Caesarea.

Arrival in Palestine

At Caesarea, Clement hears that the apostle Peter is there and is about to hold a disputation with Simon Magus. At Peter's lodging he finds Barnabas, who introduces him. Peter invites Clement to accompany him from city to city, on his way to Rome, in order to hear his discourses. Clement (so R; H credits this duty to Peter himself) sends a report of this to James, from whom Peter has an order to transmit to him accounts of all his teaching.

So far H 1 and R 1.1–21; then the two versions differ. The original order may have been as follows: Clement arises at dawn (H 2.1) and finds Peter, who continues to instruct him (2–18, compare R 2.33 and 3.61). Peter sends for two of his disciples, Nicetas and Aquila, whom he describes as foster-sons of Justa, the Syrophoenician woman whose daughter was healed by Christ. They had been educated from boyhood by Simon Magus, but had been converted by Zacchaeus, another disciple of Peter (19–21), whom H identifies with Zachaeus the tax-collector.

Aquila

Aquila relates Simon's parentage, his Samaritan origin, and Simon's claim to be greater than the God who created the world (H 2.22; R 2.7). After the death of John the Baptist Simon Magus infiltrated the remaining group of 30 followers by seducing Soditheus the leader in order to take control and start his cult. Simon was never a follower of John the Baptist he was an opportunist. Soon after taking control for a short time the followers of John abandoned him when they realised his true nature and agenda. sadly Luna the only female mentioned as part of the group was also captivated by Simon Magus and she continued on with him as his partner.

Simon claimed that he could make himself visible or invisible at will, pass through rocks as if they were clay, throw himself down from a mountain unhurt, loose himself when bound, animate statues, make trees spring up; throw himself into a fire without harm, appear to have two faces: "I shall change myself into a sheep or a goat. I shall make a beard to grow upon little boys. I shall ascend by flight into the air, I shall exhibit abundance of gold. I shall make and unmake kings. I shall be worshiped as God, I shall have divine honors publicly assigned to me, so that an image of me shall be set up, and I shall be adored as God." (R 2.9.).   Next day at noon, Zacchaeus announced that Simon had put off the promised debate (H 2.35–7; R 2.20–1) and Peter instructed Clement into the evening (H 2.38–53).

Possible Ebionite content
As Fred Lapham notes, a substantial part of the first book of R (1.27-71) differs from the form and content of the rest of the work. This part of R consists of three distinct works added to R either by the compiler or a later editor. These works have been labelled by more recent scholars as follows:
 First comes an account of the creation and the history of Israel down to the Coming of Christ (1.27-42)
 Next is a treatise which deals with the question whether Jesus should be understood as "the eternal Christ", and discusses his priestly and salvatory role (1.44-52). Lapham notes much of this material is similar to canonical works such as the Epistle to the Hebrews and 1 Thessalonians.
 Last is a section which many have believed to correspond to the Ascents of James cited by Epiphanius of Salamis (1.53-71). If these scholars are correct, then this section would express a form of Ebionite beliefs

Debate between Peter and Simon

Next morning before dawn Peter arouses his disciples (H 3.1; R 2.1), who are enumerated (H 2.1; R 2.1). Peter gives a private preparatory discourse (H) and then goes out to the public discussion with Simon. Only one day of it is related in H (3.38–57), but the whole matter of the three days is given in R (2.24–70; 3.12–30, 33–48). But what H has omitted here it gives largely, though in a different form, in chapters 16, 17, 18, and partly in 19, as another discussion with Simon in Laodicea. It is clear that R has the original order. Simon, being worsted, flies in the night to Tyre. Peter determines to follow, leaving Zacchaeus as bishop at Caesarea (H 3.58–72; R 3.63–6). H adds that Peter remained seven days longer and baptized 10,000 people, sending on Nicetas and Aquila to stay at Tyre with Bernice, daughter of their stepmother, Justa (3.73). But R relates that seven other disciples were sent on, while Clement remained at Caesarea for three months with Peter, who repeated in private at night the public instructions he gave during the day; all this Clement wrote down and sent to James. In chapter 75 the contents of the ten books of these sermons as sent to Jerusalem are described.

Tyre

H now makes Clement, Nicetas, and Aquila go on to Tyre. Bernice tells them how Simon has been raising ghosts, infecting the people with diseases, and bringing demons upon them, and has gone to Sidon. Clement has a discussion with Simon's disciple Appion (H 5.7  –  6.25). All this is omitted by R, but the same subjects are discussed in R 10.17–51. Peter goes on northward by Tyre, Sidon, Berytos (Beirut), and Byblos to Tripolis (H 7.5–12). (R adds Dora and Ptolemais (Akko), omitting Byblos, 4.1.) Peter's discourses to the multitude at Tripolis are detailed in H (books 8–11), and in R (three days only, 4–6), with considerable differences. Clement is baptized (H 11.35; R 6.15). After a stay of three months he goes through Ortosias to Antaradus (H 12.1; R 7.1).

Clement's life story

At this point Clement recounts his history to Peter. He was closely related to the emperor. Soon after his birth his mother had a vision that unless she speedily left Rome with her twin elder sons, she and they would perish miserably. His father therefore sent them with many servants to Athens, but they disappeared, and nothing could be learned of their fate. At last, when Clement was twelve years old, his father himself set out upon the search; and he too was no more heard of (H 12.9–11; R 7.8–10). In the island of Aradus, opposite the town, Peter finds a miserable beggar woman, who turns out to be Clement's mother. Peter unites them, and heals the woman (H 12.12–23; R 7.11–23). H adds a discourse by Peter on philanthropy (25–33). The party now leave Aradus (Mattidia, Clement's mother, travels with Peter's wife) and go by Balaneae, Palates, and Gable to Laodicea in Syria. Nicetas and Aquila receive them, and hear Clement's story with surprise; they declare themselves to be the twin sons of Mattidia and brothers of Clement, Faustus and Faustinus. They had been saved on a fragment of wreck, and some men in a boat had taken them up.

They had been beaten and starved, and finally sold at Caesarea Stratton to Justa, who had educated them as her own sons. Later they had adhered to Simon, but were brought by Zacchaeus to Peter. Upon hearing this, Mattidia is baptized, and Peter discourses on the rewards given to chastity (H 12; R 7.24–38).

The recognitions

The next morning Peter is interrupted at his prayers by an old man, who assures him that prayer is a mistake, since all things are governed by nemesis or fate. Peter replies (H 14.1–5; R names him Nicetas); Aquila and Clement try also to refute him (8.5  –  9.33; compare H 15.1–5), but without success, for the old man had cast a horoscope for himself and his wife, and he explains how it came true. Clement, Nicetas, and Aquila recognize that this man is their father; Peter asks his name and those of his children.

Their mother rushes in, and all embrace in floods of tears. Faustus is then converted by a long series of discourses on evil and on mythology (in R these appear at 10.1–51; in H to 20.1–10 and 4.7–6.25, the discussion between Clement and Appion at Tyre; the long discussions with Simon before Faustus in H books 16, 17 and 18 were in their right place in R as part of the debate at Caesarea). Simon is driven away by the threats of Cornelius the Centurion, but first he changes the face of Faustus into his own likeness by smearing it with a magic juice, in hopes that Faustus will be put to death instead of himself. Peter frightens away Simon's disciples by what are simply lies, and he sends Faustus to Antioch to unsay in the person of Simon all the abuse Simon has been pouring on the Apostle there. The people of Antioch in consequence long for Peter's coming, and nearly put the false Simon to death. Peter restores him to his proper form, and thenceforth they all live happily.

Clement's letter

Clement's letter to James forms the epilogue to H. In it, Clement relates how Peter on his death bed gave his last instructions and set Clement in his own chair as his successor in the See of Rome. James is addressed as "Bishop of bishops, who rules Jerusalem, the holy Church of the Hebrews, and the Churches everywhere". To him Clement sends a book, "Clement's Epitome of the Preachings of Peter from place to place". Another letter, that of Peter to James, forms an introduction. The Apostle urges that the book of his teachings not be committed to anyone before initiation and probation. A note follows the letter, relating that James on receipt of the letter called the elders and read it to them. The book is to be given only to one who is pious, and a teacher, and circumcised, and even then only a part at a time.

A form of promise (not an oath, which is unlawful) is prescribed for the reader, by heaven, earth, water, and air, that he will take extraordinary care of the writings and communicate them to no one; he invokes upon himself terrible curses in case he should be unfaithful to this covenant. The most curious passage is: "Even if I should come to acknowledge another God, I now swear by him, whether he exist or not." After the adjuration he shall partake of bread and salt. The elders, on hearing of this solemnity, are terrified, but James pacifies them.

Characters in the Clementine literature

Matthidia 
Matthidia is the mother of Clement and the twins Faustus and Faustinus (known in the story as Niceta and Aquila). She is of noble birth and married to Faustus, a relative of Emperor Augustus. When her brother-in-law starts making sexual advances on her, she, wanting to avoid a scandal, decides to leave Rome for Athens with the twins but suffers a shipwreck along the way. She comes ashore on the island of Arados where Peter later recognizes  her on the basis of Clement's account. Peter takes Matthidia to her son and later, the whole family is reunited and baptized.

Justa 
Justa is the foster mother of Nicetas and Aquila. When the twins are captured and enslaved by pirates after the shipwreck, Justa buys back their freedom and gives them a Greek education. In Recognitions, she is simply described as a Jewish widow. In Homilies, she is a proselyte of Syro-Phoenician origin whose daughter was healed by Jesus (see Mark. 7:24-30).

Early references
It was long believed that the early date of the Clementines was proved by the fact that they were twice quoted by Origen. One of these quotations occurs in the Philokalia of Sts. Gregory of Nazianzus and Basil (c. 360). Dr. Armitage Robinson showed in his edition of that work (1893) that the citation is an addition to the passage of Origen made by the compilers, or possibly by a later editor. The other citation occurs in the old Latin translation of Origen on Matthew. This translation is full of interpolations and alterations, and the passage of Pseudo-Clement is apparently an interpolation by the translator from the Arian Opus imperfectum in Matt.

Omitting Origen, the earliest witness is Eusebius. In his Ecclesiastical History, III, xxxviii (AD 325) he mentions some short writings and adds: 
"And now some have only the other day brought forward other wordy and lengthy compositions as being Clement's, containing dialogues of Peter and Appion, of which there is absolutely no mention in the ancients."
These dialogues need not have been the complete romance, but may have been an earlier draft of part of it. Next we find the Clementines used by Ebionites c. 360. They are quoted as the Periodi by St. Jerome in 387 and 392 (On Galatians 1:18, and Adv. Jovin., 1:26). Two forms of the Recognitions were known to Rufinus, and one of them was translated by him c. 400. 
Around 408,  Paulinus of Nola in a letter to Rufinus mentions having himself translated a part or all, perhaps as an exercise in Greek. The Opus imperfectum above mentioned has five quotations. It is apparently by an Arian of the beginning of the 5th century, possibly by a bishop called Maximus. 
The Syriac translation was made before 411, the date of one of the Manuscripts. After this time citations occur in many Byzantine writers, and from the commendation given by Nicephorus Callisti (14th century) we may gather that an orthodox version was current. In the West the translation by Rufinus became very popular, and citations are found in Syriac and Arabic writings.

Origin and date hypotheses

In Schneemelcher's NTA
The traditionally standard edition of the New Testament Apocrypha edited by Wilhelm Schneemelcher includes a translation and commentary of the Pseudo-Clementines by Johannes Irmscher and Georg Strecker. Strecker places the Homilies as 3rd Century, the Recognitions as 4th Century.

Theories of Baur
Hegelian philosopher and theologian Ferdinand Christian Baur, the founder of the Tübingen School of New Testament Higher criticism, based some of his theories about the New Testament on the Clementines. In turn, his ideas about the Clementines were based on descriptions by St. Epiphanius of Salamis (c. 310–320 – 403), regarding the beliefs and writings of Christian Ebionites in the 4th century. This Judeo-Christian sect, which  thought themselves to be the authentic remnant of the earliest disciples of Jesus, rejected St. Paul as both a false apostle of Christ and an apostate from Torah-observant Judaism. Ebionites asserted that their position also represented the Christianity of the Twelve Apostles. "Paulinism", asserting salvation by faith without works of the law, was thus regarded as a heresy. This Pauline gospel thus caused a schism from the authentic apostolic Jewish Christianity originally headed by James, brother of Jesus and Saint Peter. Baur held that the Clementine references to the notorious Samaritan sorcerer Simon Magus (see ) were actually covert polemics against Paul. In Baur's historical theory, Catholicism resulted from the eventual accommodation necessitated between the Petrine and Pauline factions of the Church, beginning in the late 2nd century. The tradition that Peter and Paul co-founded Rome's Church in the mid-1st-century and were martyred together, is regarded as a fiction.

Contrary view
Throughout the middle of the 19th century this theory, in many forms, was dominant in Germany. The demonstration, mainly by English scholars, of the impossibility of the late dates ascribed to the New Testament documents  (four Epistles of St. Paul and the Apocalypse were the only documents generally admitted as being of early date), and the proofs of the authenticity of the Apostolic Fathers and of the use of St. John's Gospel by Justin, Papias, and Ignatius gradually brought Baur's theories into discredit. Of the original school, Adolf Hilgenfeld may be considered the last survivor (died 1907). He was induced many years ago to admit that Simon Magus was a real personage, though he persists that in the Clementines he is meant for St. Paul. To a priori critics it counts as nothing that Simon holds no Pauline doctrine and that the author shows no signs of being a Judæo-Christian. In 1847 Hilgenfeld dated the original nucleus (Kerygmata Petrou) soon after the Jewish war of 70; successive revisions of it were anti-Basilidian, anti-Valentinian, and anti-Marcionite respectively. Baur placed the completed form, H, soon after the middle of the 2nd century, and Schliemann (1844) agreed, placing R, as a revision, between 211 and 230. Other writers dated both H and R to between the 2nd and 4th centuries:

 R. 2nd century: Sixtus Senensis, Blondellus, Nourri, Cotelerius, Natalis Alexander, Cave, Oudin, Heinsius, Rosenmüller, Flügge, Gieseler, Friedrich Tholuck, Bretschneider, Engelhardt, Gfrörer.
 R. 2nd or 3rd century: Schröck, Stark, Lumper, Krabbe, Locherer, Gersdorf.
 R. 3rd century: Strunzius (on Bardesanes, 1710), Weismann (17l8), Mosheim, Kleuker, Schmidt (Kirchengesch.)
 R. 4th century: Corrodi, Lentz (Dogmengesch.).
 H. 2nd century (beginning): Credner, Bretschneider, Kern, Rothe.
 H. 2nd century: Clericus, Beausobre, Flügge, Münscher, Hoffmann, Döllinger, Hilgers; (middle of 2nd) Hase.
 H. end of 2nd century: Schröck, Cölln, Gieseler (3rd ed.), Schenkel, Gfrörer, Lücke.
 H. 3rd century: Mill, Mosheim, Gallandi, Gieseler (2nd ed.).
 H. 2nd or 3rd century: Neander, Krabbe, Baur, Ritter, Paniel, Dähne.
 H. 4th century: Lentz.

History of Salvation 
Josep Rius-Camps called the fragment Rec I, 27-74 'History of Salvation' (HS) and proposed its belonging to the B or Original Writing, quite ancient. Rius-Camps' study, however, does not grant to the first part of HS (Rec I, 27-42) the antiquity and independence that practically all researchers accept (although few agree on the limits of the ancient source).
Most scholars date (Rec I, 27-74) it after Hadrian although a minority (Bardsley, Thomas, Cullmann)
date it around the year 100 in the interwar period. Pedro Giménez De Aragón Sierra considers that must have been written between 96 and 116.

Regarding the claim of HS is not to proclaim the end of the Torah, but to make the Jews see that they can remain Jews by renouncing the sacrifices and admitting the messianic character of Jesus.
With respect to the Gentiles, their goal was to reinterpret the Torah to make it more acceptable to the Gentiles. In the cross-cultural process of constructing the Roman identity, the Judeo-Christians of HS wanted to participate by Judaizing the Empire, for which they yielded a little in their Jewish beliefs, making them more lax. However, it would not be of special interest to the Christian gentiles because they had found other more adequate versions to engender that ideological syncretism between Greco-Roman paganism and Judaism that was the triumphant Christianity. Those other triumphant versions are those of Luke, Paul, Barnabas, Mark and many others who, without rejecting the Torah, the Prophets and the historical books (i.e. the Old Testament), relativized them through the superiority of a series of scriptures that emerged precisely in the same interwar period in which HS was written (Gospels, Acts, epistles). Even if the ideology of HS was closer to the primitive ideology of the followers of Jesus, that did not make it more suitable than these other scriptures for the world that was being built.

Other opinions
Uhlhorn in his valuable monograph (1854) placed the original document in East Syria. after 150; H in the same region after 160; R in Rome after 170. Lehmann (1869) put the source (Kerygmata Petrou) very early, H and R i–ii before 160, the rest of R before 170. In England Salmon set R about 200, H about 218. Dr. Bigg makes H the original, Syrian, first half of 2nd century, R being a recasting in an orthodox sense. H was originally written by a Catholic, and the heretical parts belong to a later recension. A. C. Headlam considers that the original form was rather a collection of works than a single book, yet all products of one design and plan, coming from one writer, of a curious, versatile, unequally developed mind. While accepting the dependence on the Book of Elchasai, Headlam sees no antagonism to St. Paul, and declares that the writer is quite ignorant of Judaism. Under the impression that the original work was known to Origen, he is obliged to date it at the end of the 2nd century or the beginning of the third. In 1883 Bestmann made the Clementines the basis of an unsuccessful theory which, as Harnack puts it, "claimed for Jewish Christianity the glory of having developed by itself the whole doctrine, worship, and constitution of Catholicism, and of having transmitted it to Gentile Christianity as a finished product which only required to be divested of a few Jewish husks".

Another popular theory based upon the Clementines has been that it was the Epistle of Clement to James which originated the notion that St. Peter was the first Bishop of Rome. This has been asserted by no lesser authorities than J. B. Lightfoot, George Salmon, and Bright, and it has been made an important point in the controversial work of the Rev. F. W. Puller, "Primitive Saints and the Roman See". It is acknowledged that in St. Cyprian's time (c. 250) it was universally believed that St. Peter was Bishop of Rome, and that he was looked upon as the type and origin of episcopacy. Modern criticism has long since put the letter of Clement too late to allow this theory to be tenable, and now Hans Waitz places it after 220, and Harnack after 260.

Joseph Langen
The Old Catholic Professor Joseph Langen in 1890 elaborated a new theory. Until the destruction of Jerusalem in 135, he says, that city was the centre of the Christian Church. A new pivot was then needed. The Church of the capital made a bold bid for the vacant post of pre-eminence. Shortly after 135 was published the original form of the Clementine romance. It was a Roman forgery, claiming for the Church of Peter the succession to a part of the headship of the Church of James. James indeed had been "bishop of bishops", and Peter's successor could not claim to be more than Peter was among the Apostles, primus inter pares. The Roman attempt was eventually successful, but not without a struggle. Caesarea, the capital of Roman Iudaea province, also claimed the succession to Jerusalem. The monument of this claim is H, a recension of the Roman work made at Caesarea before the end of the 2nd century in order to fight Rome with her own weapons. (The intention must be admitted to have been closely veiled.) In the beginning of the 3rd century the metropolis of the Orient, Antioch, produced a new edition, R, claiming for that city the vacant primacy. Langen's view has found no adherents.

Further scholarship
F.J.A. Hort complained that the Clementines have left no traces in the eighty years between Origen and Eusebius, but he felt obliged to date them before Origen, and placed the original c. 200 as the work of a Syrian Heixaïte. Harnack, in his "History of Dogma", saw that they had no influence in the 3rd century; he dated R and H not earlier than the first half of that century, or even a few decades later. All the foregoing writers presupposed that the Clementines were known to Origen. Since this has been shown to be not proven (1903), Hans Waitz's elaborate study has appeared (1904), but his view was evidently formed earlier. His view is that H is the work of an Aramaean Christian after 325 (for he uses the word homoousios) and earlier than 411 (the Syriac Manuscript). R probably after 350, also in the East. But the Grundschrift, or archetype, was written at Rome, perhaps under the syncretistic system of cult in favour at the court of Alexander Severus, probably between 220 and 250. Harnack, in his "Chronologie" (II), gives 260 or later as the date, but he thinks H and R may be ante-Nicene. Waitz supposes two earlier sources to have been employed in the romance, the Kerygmata Petrou (origin in 1st century, but used in a later anti-Marcionite recension) and the Acts of Peter (written in a Catholic circle at Antioch c. 210). Harnack accepts the existence of these sources, but thinks neither was earlier than about 200. They are carefully to be distinguished from the well-known 2nd century works, the Preaching of Peter and Acts of Peter, of which fragments still exist. These are quoted by many early writers, whereas the supposed sources of the Clementines are otherwise unknown and therefore probably never existed at all. A long passage from De Fato of Bardesanes occurs in R ix, 19 sqq. Hilgenfeld, Albrecht Ritschl, and some earlier critics characteristically held that Bardesanes used the Clementines. Merx, Waitz, and most others hold that R. cites Bardesanes directly. François Nau and Harnack are certainly right, that R. has borrowed the citation at second hand from Eusebius.

Eunomius
R is certainly post-Nicene, as Waitz has shown. But we may go further. The curious passage R iii. 2–11, which Rufinus omitted, and in which he seemed to hear Eunomius himself speaking, gives in fact the doctrine of Eunomius so exactly that it frequently almost cites the Apologeticus (c. 362–3) of that heretic word for word. (The Eunomian doctrine is that the essence of God is to be unborn, consequently the Son Who is begotten is not God. He is a creature, the first-born of all creation and the Image of God. The Holy Ghost is the creature of the Son.) The agreement with Eunomius's  of 381–3 is less close. As the Eunomian passage was found by Rufinus in both the recensions of Clement known to him, we may suppose that the interpolation was made in the original work by a Eunomian about 365–70, before the abridgment R was made about 370–80. (The word archiepiscopus used of St. James suggests the end of the 4th century. It occurs in the middle of that century in some Meletian documents cited by Athanasius, and then not until the First Council of Ephesus, 431.)

The generation of the Son

H has also a disquisition on the generation of the Son (xvi, 15–18, and xx, 7–8). His idea of a changeable God and an unchangeable Son projected from the best modification of God has been mentioned above. This ingenious doctrine enables the writer to accept the words of the Nicene definition, while denying their sense. The Son may be called God, for so may men be, but not in the strict sense. Apparently He is not , nor was there a time when He was not, though this is not quite distinctly enunciated. The writer is clearly an Arian who manages to accept the formula of Nicea by an acrobatic feat, in order to save himself. The date is therefore probably within the reign of Constantine (died 337), while the great council was still imposed on all by the emperor, about 330.

God is not masculo-femina. It is clear that the interpolator had before him the doctrine of H. in a yet clearer form, and that he substituted his own view for it (R. iii, 2–11). But it is remarkable that he retained one integral part of H'''s theory, viz., the origin of the Evil One from an accidental mixture of elements, for Rufinus tells us (De Adult. libr. Origenis) that he found this doctrine in R and omitted it. The date of the original is therefore fixed as after Nicea, 325, probably c. 330; that of H may be anywhere in the second half of the 4th century. The Eunomian interpolator is about 365–70, and the compilation of R about 370–80.

Authorship

The original author shows a detailed knowledge of the towns on the Phoenician coast from Caesarea to Antioch. He was an Arian, and Arianism had its home in the civil diocese of the Orient. He uses the Praeparatio Evangelica of Eusebius of Caesarea (written about 313). In 325 that historian mentions the dialogues of Peter and Appion as just published — presumably in his own region; these were probably the nucleus of the larger work completed by the same hand a few years later. Citations of Pseudo-Clement are by the Palestinian Epiphanius, who found the romance among the Ebionites of Palestine; by St. Jerome, who had dwelt in the Syrian desert and settled at Bethlehem; by the travelled Rufinus; by the Apostolical Constitutions, compiled in Syria or Palestine. The work is rendered into Syriac before 411. The Arian author of the Opus imperfectum cited it freely. It was interpolated by a Eunomian about 365–70. All these indications suggest an Arian author before 350 in the East, probably not far from Caesarea.

The author, though an Arian, probably belonged nominally to the Catholic Church. He wrote for the heathens of his day, and observed the stiff and often merely formal disciplina arcani which the 4th century enforced. Atonement, grace, sacraments are omitted for this cause only. "The true Prophet" is not a name for Christ used by Christians, but the office of Christ which the author puts forward towards the pagan world. He shows Peter keeping the evening agape and Eucharist secret from Clement when unbaptized; it was no doubt a Eucharist of bread and wine, not of bread and salt.

Iamblichus
The great pagan antagonist of the 3rd century was the neo-Platonic philosopher, Porphyry; but under Constantine his disciple Iamblichus was the chief restorer and defender of the old gods, and his system of defence is that which we find made the official religion by Julian (361–3). Consequently, it is not astonishing to find that Simon and his disciples represent not St. Paul, but Iamblichus. The doctrines and practices repelled are theurgy, astrology, divinations, miracles, and claims to union with the Divine, which characterized the neo-Platonism of 320–30. It is not against Marcion but against Plato that Pseudo-Clement teaches the supremacy of the Creator of all. He defends the Old Testament against the school of Porphyry, and when he declares it to be interpolated, he is using Porphyry's own higher criticism. The elaborate discussion of ancient history, the ridicule cast on the mythology of the Greeks, and the philosophical explanations of a higher meaning are also against Porphyry. The refutation of idolatry is against Iamblichus.

Late 4th century
It is perhaps mere accident that we hear nothing of the Clementines from 330 until 360. But about 360–410 they are interpolated, they are revised and abridged in H, yet more revised and abridged in R, translated into Latin, translated into Syriac, and frequently cited. It seems, therefore, that it was the policy of Julian which drew them from obscurity. They were useful weapons against the momentary resurrection of polytheism, mythology, theurgy, and idolatry.

 References 

 
 Notes 

Bibliography
Drawn from the 1908 Catholic Encyclopedia and 1911 Jewish Encyclopedia1804–1880
BUSSELL, The Purpose of the World-Process and the Problem of Evil in the Clementine and Lactantian Writings in Studia Biblica (1806), IV;
SCHLIEMANN, Die Clementinen (1844);
HILGENFELD, Die Clem. Recogn. und Hom. nach ihrem Ursprung und Inhalt (Jena, 1848); Kritische Untersuchungen über die Evangelien Justins, der Clem. Hom. und Marcions (Halle, 1850);
UHLHORN, Die Hom. und Recogn. des Clemens Romanus (Göttingen, 1854);
LEHMANN, Die clementinischen Schriften (Gotha, 1869)
An English translation of the Recognitions, by the REV. T. SMITH, D. D., will be found in the Ante-Nicene Library. III, and of the Homilies, ibid., XVII (Edinburgh, 1871–72).
LIPSIUS, Quellen der römischen Petrussage (1872) and Apokr. Apostelgeschichte (1887), II;
SALMON in Dict. Chr. Biog. (1877);

1881–1908
LANGEN, Die Clemensromane (Gotha, 1890):
FUNK in Kirchenlexikon. (1884);
BIGG, The Clementine Homilies in Studia Biblica (Oxford, 1890), II;
W. CHAWNER, Index of noteworthy words and phrases found in the Clementine writings in Lightfoot Fund Public. (London, 1893);
HORT, Clementine Recognitions (lectures delivered in 1884; pub. London, 1901);
MEYBOOM De Clemens Roman (1902);
A. C. Headlam, The Clementine Literature in Journ. Theol. Stud. (1903), III, 41;
CHAPMAN, Origen and Pseudo-Clement in JTS, III, 436;
HILGENFELD, Origenes und Pseudo-Clemens in Zeitschr. für Wiss. Theol. (1903), XLVI, 342;
PREUSCHEN In HARNACK, Gesch. der altchristl. Literatur (1893), I, 212; and II, Chronologie, 518;
Waitz, H., Die Pseudoclementinen in Texte und Unters., New Series, X, 4;
CHAPMAN, The Date of the Clementines in Zeitschr. für Neu-Test. Wiss. (1908).

Modern sources
Johann Irmscher and Georg Strecker The Pseudo-Clementines in Wilhelm Schneemelcher New Testament Apocrypha.

F. Stanley Jones, “The Pseudo-Clementines: A History of Research,” SCe 2 (1982): 1–33; 63–96.
F. Stanley Jones, An Ancient Jewish Christian Source on theHistory of Christianity. Pseudo-Clementine Recognitions 1.27 – 71, SBL Texts andTranslations 37, Christian Apocrypha Series 2 (Atlanta, GA: Scholars Press, 1995),1–38 
Nicole Kelley, Knowledge and Religious Authority in the Pseudo-Clementines, Wissenschaftliche Untersuchungen zum Neuen Testament 2/213 (Tübingen: MohrSiebeck, 2006), 17–27
Jonathan Bourgel, "The Holders of the "Word of Truth": The Pharisees in Pseudo-Clementine Recognitions 1.27–71," Journal of Early Christian Studies'' 25.2 (2017) 171–200

External links

Introductions and e-texts of Clementine literature
The Clementine Homilies (English translation) Ante-Nicene Christian Library, Vol. XVII, T & T Clark, 1852
John Chapman article in 1904 Catholic Encyclopedia: Clementines
Kaufmann Kohler article in 1911 Jewish Encyclopedia: Clementina
Sinai epitome of the Recognitions of Clement (Arabic)
Kitab al-Magall, or the Book of the Rolls - part of Arabic Clementine literature

Christian anti-Gnosticism
Ancient Christian controversies
2nd-century Christian texts
Christian terminology
Petrine-related books
Jewish Christian literature